Zambales's 1st congressional district is one of the two congressional districts of the Philippines in the province of Zambales. It has been represented in the House of Representatives since 1987. The district consists of the city of Olongapo and adjacent municipalities in the southernmost part of Zambales, namely Castillejos, San Marcelino and Subic. It is currently represented in the 19th Congress by Jefferson F. Khongun of the Nacionalista Party (NP).

Representation history

Election results

2022

2019

2016

2013

2010

See also
Legislative districts of Zambales

References

Congressional districts of the Philippines
Politics of Zambales
1987 establishments in the Philippines
Congressional districts of Central Luzon
Constituencies established in 1987